Two Soldiers or Two Warriors (Dva boitsa) is a 1943 war film made in Tashkent (where the Soviet cinema industry had been evacuated) at the height of the Great Patriotic War. The film stars Boris Andreyev and Mark Bernes as two war buddies. The "beautiful" film was directed by Leonid Lukov.

The movie features two of Nikita Bogoslovsky's most famous songs, Dark Is the Night and Boatfuls of Mullet. Both were performed by Mark Bernes. His warm and sincere delivery of Dark Is the Night won the sympathy of millions of Soviet people, catapulting Bernes into enduring fame.

Cast 
 Mark Bernes as Arkady
 Boris Andreyev as Sasha
 Vera Shershnyova as Tanya
 Yanina Zheymo as Nurse (as Ya. Zhejmo)
 Maksim Shtraukh as Professor (as M. Shtraukh)
 Ivan Kuznetsov as Galanin (as I. Kuznetsov)
 Stepan Krylov as Maj. Rudoy (as S. Krylov)
 Lavrenti Masokha as Okulita (as L. Masokha)

References

External links 
 
 Pravda review by Vsevolod Pudovkin

1940s buddy films
1940s war films
1943 films
Soviet black-and-white films
Soviet war films
1940s Russian-language films
Eastern Front of World War II films
Films set in 1941
Films set in 1942
Films set in Saint Petersburg
Films shot in Uzbekistan
Soviet World War II films